Vocabulario de la lengua tagala was the first dictionary of the Tagalog language in the Philippines, It was written by the Franciscan friar Pedro de San Buena Ventura and published in Pila, Laguna in 1613. Juan de Plasencia had written a vocabulario earlier but it was not printed. More than a century later, a dictionary of the same name was prepared by Jesuit priests Juan de Noceda and Pedro de Sanlucar; their first edition was published in Manila in 1754 and then the second in 1860 which was reissued by the Komisyon sa Wikang Filipino in 2013.

Historical and Linguistic Value
The Vocabulario de la lengua tagala by Pedro de San Buenaventura, O.F.M. printed in Pila, Laguna in 1613, is a jewel of Spanish-Filipino literature. In the first place, its rarity makes it appear among the extremely small number of Filipino incunabula — works printed in the Philippines between the years 1593–1643 — of which copies are still preserved. It is also the first vocabulary or dictionary of a Philippine language printed by Spanish missionaries. The two reasons should suffice, on their own, to assess in all its merit the present work.

It seems convenient, however, to briefly present the geographical and historical context in which Pedro de San Buenaventura carried out the elaboration and printing of his Vocabulario in order to be able to better appreciate both the value of the original edition and that of the present reissue. Wenceslao E. Retana, a great biblophile and historian of the Philippines, did not hesitate to affirm already at the end of the last century, that "Filipino books, in general, are much more scarce than those of any other country in the world (...); the Filipino prints, known by sight, from the 17th and 18th centuries can be counted on the fingers of one hand" (Catálogo abreviado de la biblioteca filipina de W. E. Retana, Madrid 1898, prólogo).

Complex linguistic world of the Philippines
When the El Adelantado Miguel López de Legazpi and his companions, including six Augustinian missionaries, arrived in the Philippines on February 13, 1565, they found a relatively complex linguistic world. On the island of Luzon alone, six major languages were spoken and a considerable number of dialects. According to statistics, of approximate value, carried out in 1591, Tagalog, the most widespread language, was spoken by 124,000 people, Ilocano 75,000, Bicol 77,000, Pangasinan 24,000, Pampango 75,000, and Ibanag 96,000. The broadest linguistic group was Bisaya, spoken in the center of the archipelago.

This wide linguistic diversity that persists today decisively influenced the planning of the missionary strategy of Augustinians, Franciscans, Jesuits, Dominicans and Augustinian Recollects. The missionaries were aware, from the beginning, of the need to master languages in order to be able to faithfully and effectively transmit, firstly, the Gospel, and secondly, important aspects of the Spanish culture itself.

Linguistic studies on Tagalog (1580-1898)
The first missionary who devoted special attention to the study of the languages of the Philippines was the Augustinian Martín de Rada (1533-1578), who chroniclers say spoke fluently in Visayan and Chinese. However, it does not seem that an effort was made to study any language systematically until the year 1580, the date on which the Franciscan Extramaduran Juan de Plasencia (+ 1590) undertook a great project. One of the most interesting fruits of it was the publication of the Doctrina christiana en letra y lengua española y tagala, Manila 1593, one of the first three works printed in the Philippines, although by the xylographic method traditionally used by the Chinese, attributed to Plasencia.

The division of the missionary territory carried out by virtue of the royal decree of April 27, 1594 allowed the religious Orders to focus their linguistic efforts on two, three or, at most, four important languages, in addition, logically, to Tagalog, the language spoken in the Manila hinterland that has served as the basis for the national language.

For the reasons indicated, all the Orders cultivated Tagalog, although not with identical interests and equal results. In reality, the linguistics studies on this language, as well as the books published in it, far exceed those carried out on the rest of the languages and dialects of the Philippines. Below are brief summaries of the grammars and dictionaries of the Tagalog language printed during the period corresponding to the years 1593–1898. It should be remembered that confessionals, Christian doctrines and other devotional works written in Tagalog are also very important for the knowledge of this language.

The Augustinians printed in Manila, in 1703, the Compendio de la lengua tagala, by Gaspar de San Agustin (1650–1724), Arte de la lengua tagala, Sampaloc 1740, by Tomás Ortiz (1668–1742), and Gramática de la lengua tagala dispuesta para la más fácil inteligencia de los religiosos principiantes by Manuel Buezeta (1808–?), Madrid 1850. One of the most interesting and original works published by the Augustinians, although relatively recently, is the Estudio de los antiguos alfabetos filipinos, Malabon 1895 by Cipriano Marcilla y Martín (1851–?).

The famous Bañezano Agustín María de Castro (1740–1801) wrote, under the pseudonym Pedro Andrés de Castro, Ortografía y reglas de la lengua tagala, published for the first time and in facsimile edition in Madrid, in 1930, by the distinguished bibliophile Antonio Graiño.

The Jesuits Juan José Noceda (1681–1747) and Pedro Sanlúcar (1706–?), in collaboration with other members of the company, printed in Manila, 1754, his famous Vocabulario de la lengua tagala, a work perhaps not surpassed until now within its category.

The Dominicans despite having arrived in the Islands after the Augustinians, Franciscans, and Jesuits, were ahead of all of them with the publication of Arte y reglas de lengua tagala, Bataan 1610, the first printed Tagalog grammar, by Fr. Francisco Blancas de San José (?–1614), promoter of the printing press in the Philippines and considered the best Tagalist of all time. This is another of the invaluable Filipino incunabula. Francisco Blancas did not, however, have successors within his Order. Only at the end of the 19th century, José Hevia y Campomanes (1814–1904) published his Lecciones de gramática hispano-tagala, Manila 1872, reprinted twelve times in few years.

Only one Augustinian Recollect, Toribio Minguella y Arnedo (1836–1920), occupies a place in the list of Spanish tagalists. In addition to Ensayo de gramática hispano-tagala, Manila 1878, he published Estudios comparativos entre el tagalo (Filipinas) y el sánscrito, Valladolid 1888.

The Philippines experienced a spectacular increase in its population, accompanied by a strong economic development, in the last decades of the 18th century and throughout the 19th century. Both phenomena contributed to the fact that Europeans — soldiers, civil servants, missionaries and businessmen, mainly Spanish and of a higher cultural level than in previous times — flocked to the Islands in greater numbers than until then. Many of the newcomers felt the need to learn the language of the natives as quickly as possible. Hence, in the second half of the 19th century several grammars and vocabularies signed by laymen belonging mostly to the aforementioned classes appeared.

These studies, logically short, taking into account the needs of the majority of their recipients, nevertheless occupy an important place in the development of Tagalog linguistics.

Rosalío Serrano (1802–1867), father of Pedro Serrano Laktaw, published Diccionario de términos comunes tagalo-castellano, Manila 1854, which went through several reissues. By the same author is a work entitled Nuevo diccionario manual español-tagalo, Manila 1872. Around the same time, Venancio María de Abella, a hardworking Spanish civil servant, printed his Vademécum filipino o manual de la conversación familiar español-tagalo, seguido de un curioso vocabulario de modismos manileño, Manila 1869, which had four reissues between the years 1869–1873. Eligio Fernández published Nuevo vocabulario o Manual de conversaciones en español, tagalo y pampango, Binondo 1876, which was reprinted eight times.

Eusebio Salvá, an infantry commander, printed Vocabulario militar y guía de conversación español-tagalo-visaya, Manila 1884. In 1887, the Método teórico práctico y compendiado para aprender en brevísimo tiempo el lenguaje tagalo, appeared in Barcelona, by Julius Miles, pseudonym from a military doctor it seems. Trinidad Hermenegildo Pardo de Tavera (1857–1925), versatile Filipino writer, among other works, Contribución para el estudio de los antiguos alfabetos filipinos, Losana 1884, and El sánscrito en la lengua tagala, Paris 1887. Wenceslao E. Retana (1862–1924), the Spanish historian who has considerably best known the history of the Philippines, published a pamphlet entitled Los antiguos alfabetos de Filipinas, Madrid 1895. Finally, José Rizal (1861–1896), the national hero of the Philippines, published La nueva ortografía de la lengua tagala, Barcelona 1890.

But the layman who occupied the most prominent place in the field of Tagalog linguistics is Pedro Serrano Laktaw (1853–1924) with his Diccionario hispano-tagalo. Primera parte, Manila 1889. The second part of which did not appear in print until 1914.

Contributions of the Franciscans to Philippine linguistics 
Scholars seem to agree in recognizing that, in the 17th century, the Franciscans were the undisputed leaders in the field of linguistic research. It is worth noting, however, that the Order's contribution to linguistics was the result of the persevering effort of a group committed to making the ambitious project of one of the most distinguished missionaries of the Philippines a reality: the Franciscan Juan Portocarrero, better known, due to his place of origin, for the nickname of "de Plasencia".

The Custodial Chapter of the Franciscans held in 1580 made, among others, the following the decision: "That a grammar and vocabulary of the Tagalog language be written, and that the Doctrina Christiana be translated into the same language, which they entrusted to Father Juan de Plasencia, as their most advanced in the language." Three years later, in a letter to Felipe II, dated June 1585, Plasencia wrote to the King: "In the most general language that exists in these Islands I have written some things, such as the Arte de la lengua tagala y Declaración de toda la doctrina xptiana, and now I am doing the Vocabulario. They are very necessary things for all the ministers if it were printed. It would be a particular favor that Your Majesty would do us, haave us order it to be printed in Mexico at the expense of your Real Hacienda, and for this, send me your Cédula, which would be of great use to these souls".

The second of the works mentioned by Plasencia in the preceding paragraph is none other than the Doctrina christiana en lengua española y tagala. On the other hand, neither Arte nor the Vocabulario were printed, among other reasons because Plasencia died in 1590, three years before the appearance of the printing press in the Philippines.

Fr. Plasencia, in addition to being a good Tagalist, linked "language and culture, as his predecessors did, the great Franciscan linguists and ethnologists of New Spain", and encouraged other Franciscans to continue their work, thus creating a true school of Franciscan linguists.

There was a key figure in his life, Miguel de Talavera, whom he met when he was still a child, without whose help it would have been almost impossible for him to achieve his linguistic dream. Miguel was born in Nueva Granada, a Spanish city that has disappeared today, located in the territory of present-day Nicaragua. Salvador — this was his first name — arrived in the Philippines with his parents, while still a child, in the army of Miguel López de Legazpi. He remained in Cebu until 1572, when he moved to Manila. In 1578, his parents handed him over to Juan de Plasencia for his education. By then, he already spoke Visayan and Tagalog, the two most important languages of the Philippines. Close bonds of friendship and mutual aid soon emerged between the adolescent and the missionary. Salvador began accompanying the Franciscans as their interpreter. Later, he taught Plasencia the Tagalog language, and the latter taught the former Latin. In 1580, Salvador took the Franciscan habit in Manila, becoming known by the name of Fray Miguel de Talavera. His biography paralleled that of Alonso de Molina, also a Mexican Franciscan, who taught Nahuatl to his brothers in habit in New Spain. Talavera, who died in Pila (Laguna), Philippines in 1622, when he was about sixty years old, "... learned the Tagalog language from the natives as well as if it were native to it, reaching a profound understanding of it", and he wrote several works of catechetical and spiritual content. Only one of them came to appear in print, however, whose title, in Tagalog read as follows: An casalanang ipinag cacasala nan onan otos nang Dios (Sins committed against the first commandment of God), Manila 1617. The most characteristic note of this work, of which no copy is known, consists in the fact that it appeared printed in a bilingual edition, Spanish and Tagalog, and the characters proper to each one of them.

Another important follower of Plasencia's work was Juan de Oliver. This distinguished missionary was born in Valencia, on an unknown date, and arrived in the Philippines in 1582, dying there in 1599 at the age of seventy-three. One of his biographers affirms that Oliver "perfectly possessed the Tagalog and Bicol languages, in which he wrote eighteen books and pamphlets (...), and improved and augmented the Arte y Diccionario tagalo of the venerable Plasencia". Some of his works, translated into Bicol, were printed in Manila at the end of the 17th century. Those written in Tagalog did not suffer the same fate, of which a manuscript copy from the 18th century has only recently appeared.

The third component of the group of Tagalists started by Plasencia was Jerónimo Montes y Escamilla. He arrived in the Philippines in 1583 and died there, in the town of Lumban, in 1610. One of his biographers states that he was "very proficient in the Tagalog language", in which he wrote among others, the following works: Arte del idioma tagalo, Diccionario del idioma tagalo, Confesonario tagalo, and finally, Librong pangalan ay caolayao nang calolova nang quinatha nang Padre Heronymo Montes, Padre sa San Francisco, Manila 1610. Of the last of the mentioned works, three more editions are known: 1648, 1705, and 1837.

The next link in the long chain of interesting Franciscan tagalists is occupied by the name of Pedro de San Buenaventura, author of the 1613 Vocabulario. Other Franciscans continued Buenaventura's work in later times. Such Franciscans include Agustín de la Magdalena (?–1689), born in Puebla de Lillo? (León), who printed in Mexico, in 1679, his Arte del idioma tagalo. Domingo de los Santos (?–1695) from Extremadura printed in Tayabas, Quezon, in 1703, a Vocabulario de la lengua tagala, which came to replace the one printed almost a century earlier by Pedro de San Buenaventura. The Gipuzkoan from Salinas, Melchor de Oyanguren (1688–1747), published in Mexico, in 1742, his original Tagalysmo elucidado. Finally, Sebastián de Totanés (1647–1748), from Toledo, a native of the town of his last name, synthesized and updated with great success the work of his predecessors in his famous Arte de la lengua Tagala y Manual tagalo para auxilio a los religiosos de esta Santa Provincia de San Gregorio Magno de descalzos de N. S. P. S. Francisco de Filipinas, principiantes en aprender ese idioma, cuando se les ofrezca administrar los santos sacramentos, jointly printed in Sampaloc (Philippines), 1745, of which three reissues are known: 1796, 1850, 1865.

Already in the second half of the 19th century, when Spain's presence in the Philippines was coming to an end, Joaquín de Coria (1815–1873?) printed in Madrid, 1872, Nueva gramática tagalog teórico-práctica, which does not contribute important novelties.

Fray Pedro de San Buenaventura and his Vocabulario 
Pedro de San Buenaventura, whose birthplace is unknown, author of the Vocabulario published 1613, set foot on Philippine soil around the year 1594, and from then until 1627, the date of his death, which occurred while sailing towards Mexico. He devoted himself to evangelization of the towns of Nagcarlang, Paete, Mauban, Pasabango, Santa Cruz, Siniloan, Manila, Pila, Mambulao, Longos, and Capalongan, all located around Laguna de Bay. In 1613, while he was a missionary in the small town of Pila, he gave the aforementioned work to the printer. Finally, he began writing the Vocabulario on May 20, 1606, and finished printing it on May 27, 1613. Although it should be remembered that this long period of time was preceded by other ten years of intense study of the language in the area where the purest Tagalog of the Philippines was spoken.

The Vocabulario of fray Pedro, more than the work of an individual, signifies the culmination of the project initiated in the Custodial Chapter held in Manila in 1580 and gestated over nearly thirty years of missionary effort by a community: the Franciscan Order of the Philippines. This is how one of the main instruments of work of all the missionaries in the Philippines was borrn for more than a century.

For all things said, the Vocabulario of Fray Pedro de San Buenaventura is one of the most appreciated Hispano-Filipino bibliographic jewels by orientalists especially specialists in Philippine affairs. It is a voluminous work, as can easily be appreciated, and dense in its content. In its 707 pages, there are 16, 350 entries or words, in the first part, including roots and derivatives and 14,500 in the second.

Its author naively confessed that on more than one occasion, due to excessive fatigue, he felt tempted to abandon the work. "This Vocabulario, Señora – said Fray Pedro in the dedication to the Virgin Mary – cost me a lot (as you well know), because when I started it, bored with the hard work and the thought that it was going to cost me any, I put perpetual silence, but considering my innumerable obligations, I turned on myself and determined to continue and bring it to light only for God and for you...".

Besides collection of words and corresponding semantic and phonetic nuances, replacing Baybayin characters with corresponding Castilian equivalents was also done for the dictionary. The Vocabulario is also of great interest for the study of the origin of the printing press in the Philippines. The appearance of the printing press in the Philippines took place at the beginning of the 16th century. Father Francisco Blancas de San José, dissatisfied with the results obtained by xylography, used in 1593 to print the first catechisms, explained to a Chinese Christian named Juan de Vera the characteristics and operation of the movable type printing press.

Thus, the Vocabulario of Pedro de San Buenaventura is one of the first works printed in the Philippines using a movable type. This explains its typographical deficiencies, for which Fray Pedro apologized with the following words: "Because the Indios' are printers and new, it carries some other errors such as i by e, u by o, et e against, 5 by 2", and later on: "If there are any mistakes in the spelling, please fill in the discreet one, because the printers are new, and in this work they have been taught, because everything cannot be as punctual as in Castile, which are oficiales primos".

One of the most prestigious historians of the Philippines, the American William Henry Scott, who died 1993, has recently drawn the attention of scholars to the importance of the Vocabulario as a source for knowledge of pre-Hispanic Philippine technology. Scott, following a meticulous analysis of certain words of the Vocabulario, helped in knowing the aspects and instruments of Filipino pre-Hispanic technology related to agriculture (seeds, irrigation methods, ways of transplanting nurseries), fishing, hunting, the textile industry, carpentry, house building, pottery, metallurgy, etc.

Irving A. Leonard, a well-known North American historian, praised the tenacity and cultural concern of the first Spaniards who arrived in the Philippines as follows: "It seems incredible that in such a remote outpost of civilization, there would be time and place for books, given the harsh conditions of life, the lack of security against the natural elements, the constant threat of Japanese and Chinese pirates, and the seditious attitude of the natives (...). However, it was regularly read in Manila...".

References

Tagalog language
Filipino dictionaries
Primary sources for early Philippine history
Primary sources on Philippine history in the 16th century
1754 books